Salbostatin is an antibiotic and trehalase inhibitor with the molecular formula C13H23O8. Salbostatin is produced by the bacterium Streptomyces albus.

References

Further reading 

 

Salbostatin
Polyols
Secondary amines
Amino sugars